Jacques-Pierre Charles Abbatucci (21 December 1791, Zicavo, Corsica – 11 November 1857, Paris) was a Corsican-born French politician. He was a grandson of Jacques Pierre Abbatucci and a nephew of Charles Abbatucci, both of them generals of the French Revolutionary Wars.

Life
He began his professional life as a lawyer, finally becoming procureur du roi at Sartène in January 1816, conseiller to the royal court of Bastia in March 1819 and président de chambre to the court of Orléans in September 1830. In 1830 he was also elected député for Corsica, before being elected député for Le Loiret from 1839 to 1851. He was made minister of justice, Garde des Sceaux in January then a senator in December 1852, and remained a senator until his death.

Under the July Monarchy, he was an important member of the opposition, close to Odilon Barrot. He distinguished himself in the campaign of reformist banquets, presiding over the banquet at Orléans and showing zeal in organising and assisting at the last forbidden banquet on 22 February 1848. These events would bring about the Monarchy's fall and the proclamation of the Second French Republic.
 
Under the Second French Empire, in his role as garde des sceaux, he presided over the council of ministers in the emperor's absence. From 1852 to his death in 1857, he was a senator and an official councillor to Napoleon III, who made him chargé des affaires for Corsica, in which role he originated a large part of the immense progress the island realised under the Second Empire.

His son, Jean-Charles Abbatucci (1816–85), was also a deputy under the July Monarchy, and again under the French Third Republic.

References

1791 births
1857 deaths
People from Corse-du-Sud
Corsican politicians
Bonapartists
French Ministers of Justice
Members of the 1st Chamber of Deputies of the July Monarchy
Members of the 5th Chamber of Deputies of the July Monarchy
Members of the 6th Chamber of Deputies of the July Monarchy
Members of the 7th Chamber of Deputies of the July Monarchy
Members of the 1848 Constituent Assembly
Members of the National Legislative Assembly of the French Second Republic
French Senators of the Second Empire